Jefftowne is a 1998 documentary shot and directed by Daniel Kraus and distributed by Troma Entertainment.  It chronicles the life of Jeff Towne, a 39-year-old Iowa City resident who has Down syndrome, obesity, alcoholism, and circulation problems. Towne died May 4, 2018 at the University of Iowa Hospitals and Clinics at age 59.

References

1998 films
Documentary films about Down syndrome
Troma Entertainment films